Witzan (died in 795 in Liuni) also known by name Witzan was prince of the confederation of Obotrites.

As an ally of Charlemagne in his war against Saxons Witzan marched his army against Magdeburg in 782 and destroyed it completely. This provoked war with nearby Slavic nation of Wiltzi (Veléti). In the war Obotrites allied with Franks, Sorbs, Frisians fought against Wiltzi and Danes. After restoration of Saxon rebellion Witzan marched again against them and was killed in ambush by Saxons in Liuni.

Bibliography 
 Labuda G., Wican [w:] Słownik Starożytności Słowiańskich, t. VI, Wrocław 1980,  (całość), p. 415

8th-century Slavs
795 deaths
Obotrite princes
Year of birth unknown
Slavic warriors
House of Vizlav